Svetlana Anatolievna Bakhtina (Russian: Светлана Анатольевна Бахтина, born 26 September 1980) is a retired Russian artistic gymnast. She won a team silver medal at the 1997 World Artistic Gymnastics Championships.

Bakhtina took up gymnastics aged 4. In 2002 she graduated from the Voronezh Institute of Physical Education, and later worked as a gymnastics coach in Voronezh.

References

Living people
Russian female artistic gymnasts
1980 births
Medalists at the World Artistic Gymnastics Championships
Sportspeople from Voronezh
21st-century Russian women